Pitahaya is a district of the Puntarenas canton, in the Puntarenas province of Costa Rica.

Geography 
Pitahaya has an area of  km2 and an elevation of  metres.

Demographics 

For the 2011 census, Pitahaya had a population of  inhabitants.

Transportation

Road transportation 
The district is covered by the following road routes:
 National Route 1
 National Route 604

References 

Districts of Puntarenas Province
Populated places in Puntarenas Province